The following are lists of Canadian international soccer players:

List of Canada men's international soccer players
List of Canada women's international soccer players

Association football player non-biographical articles